Bierut is a surname. Notable people with the surname include:

 Bolesław Bierut (1892–1956), Polish politician, communist activist and leader of the Polish People's Republic between 1947 and 1956
 Michael Bierut (born 1957), a graphic designer, design critic and educator

See also

Beirut

Polish-language surnames